Grytten is a former municipality in Møre og Romsdal county, Norway. It existed from 1838 until its dissolution in 1964. The municipality encompassed the Romsdalen valley which follows the Rauma River from the Oppland county border to the inner part of the Romsdal Fjord at the town of Åndalsnes, as well as some smaller side valleys. The original municipality of Grytten was almost identical to the present-day Rauma Municipality, plus the southern part of Veøy Municipality (south of the Langfjorden). The administrative centre was the village of Åndalsnes.

History
Grytten was established as a municipality on 1 January 1838 (see formannskapsdistrikt law). On 1 January 1840, the northwestern part of Grytten was separated to form the new municipality of Voll og Eid. Then on 1 January 1902, the northeastern part of Grytten was separated to form the new municipality of Hen (population: 1,128), leaving Grytten with a population of 1,728.

During the 1960s, there were many municipal mergers across Norway due to the work of the Schei Committee. On 1 January 1964, the municipality of Grytten (population: 3,683) was merged with the neighboring municipalities of Eid (population: 381), Voll (population: 1,163), Hen (population: 1,663), and the southern part of Veøy municipality (population: 1,400) to form the new Rauma Municipality.

Government
All municipalities in Norway, including Grytten, are responsible for primary education (through 10th grade), outpatient health services, senior citizen services, unemployment and other social services, zoning, economic development, and municipal roads.  The municipality is governed by a municipal council of elected representatives, which in turn elects a mayor.

Municipal council
The municipal council  of Grytten was made up of representatives that were elected to four year terms.  The party breakdown of the final municipal council was as follows:

See also
List of former municipalities of Norway

References

Rauma, Norway
Former municipalities of Norway
1838 establishments in Norway
1964 disestablishments in Norway